Can Erdem (born 8 June 1987 in Istanbul) is a Turkish footballer who currently plays as a striker for Kırşehir Belediyespor.

Career
Erdem had begun his career at a local club, Alanya Belediyespor, based in Antalya. He was trained there until 2005 before joining Beşiktaş. After a short spell, he was promoted to senior squad by French manager Jean Tigana in 2006. Erdem then joined Kocaelispor on loan in the 2007–08 season. At the end of the season, Kocaelispor was promoted to the Süper Lig.

In the 2008–09 season, he returned Beşiktaş and began to train at senior squad again, under manager Ertuğrul Sağlam. However, he was loaned out to İzmir club Altay.

Honours

Club
Beşiktaş
Turkish Cup: 2006–07

Kocaelispor
Bank Asya 1. Lig: 2007–08

References

External links
 
 
 

1987 births
Living people
People from Şişli
Footballers from Istanbul
Turkish footballers
Turkey under-21 international footballers
Beşiktaş J.K. footballers
Denizlispor footballers
Turgutluspor footballers
Mersin İdman Yurdu footballers
Kocaelispor footballers
Altay S.K. footballers
Siirtspor footballers
Ankaraspor footballers
Karşıyaka S.K. footballers
Sarıyer S.K. footballers
Şanlıurfaspor footballers
Süper Lig players
TFF First League players
TFF Second League players
Association football forwards